James Harper Starr (December 18, 1809 – July 25, 1890) served as a commissioner of the Texas General Land Office and later Secretary of the Treasury of the Republic of Texas and also as director of the postal service of the Trans-Mississippi Department of the Confederate States of America during the American Civil War as well as the namesake of Starr County in Texas.

After the defeat of the Confederacy, Starr was barred from serving in public office, as were most Confederate officials. His eldest son's home in Marshall, Texas, "Maplecroft", was designated a state historic site in the 1970s and is open to the public.

References

1809 births
1890 deaths
People from Litchfield County, Connecticut
People from Franklin County, Ohio
People from Nacogdoches, Texas
People from Marshall, Texas
People of Texas in the American Civil War